Brackagh is a townland in County Westmeath, Ireland. The townland is located in the civil parish of Carrick  The townland stands between he N52 motorway and Lough Ennell. The townland is bordered by Carrick to the east, Higginstown to the south and Robinstown to the west.

References 

Townlands of County Westmeath